Chahar Rah may refer to various places in Iran:
 Chahar Rah-e Zirrah, Fars Province
 Chahar Rah, Isfahan
 Chahar Rah, Khuzestan
 Chahar Rah, Kohgiluyeh and Boyer-Ahmad
 Chahar Rah-e Ali Tayyeb, Kohgiluyeh and Boyer-Ahmad Province
 Chahar Rah Beheshti Sapu, Kohgiluyeh and Boyer-Ahmad Province
 Chahar Rah-e Soleyman, Kohgiluyeh and Boyer-Ahmad Province
 Chahar Rah, Razavi Khorasan